Polat Polatçıis a Turkish freestyle wrestler competing in the 97 kg division. He is a member of İstanbul Büyükşehir Belediyesi S.K.

Career 
Polat Polatçı won the gold medal in the men's 97 kg event at the 2021 European Juniors Wrestling Championships in Germany. Polat Polatçı was behind his Russian rival Ali Magomed Aliyev 13–6 in the final in the European Youth Wrestling Championship in Dortmund, Germany, and became the European champion by beating his opponent with a pin.

Polat Polatçı won the silver medal in the men's 97 kg event at the 2021 World Junior Wrestling Championships in Russia.

References

External links 
 

Living people
Turkish male sport wrestlers
2001 births
21st-century Turkish people